On 9 September 2016, a passenger train travelling from Vigo, Spain to Oporto, Portugal derailed at O Porriño, Galicia, Spain. Four people were killed and 49 were injured, seven seriously.

Accident

The RENFE Class 592 DMU was travelling from Vigo, Spain to Oporto, Portugal when it derailed at O Porriño, Galicia, Spain. The accident happened at 09:30 local time (07:30 UTC). The derailed train hit an overbridge and signalling tower. The driver, a ticket inspector, and two of the 69 passengers were killed and 49 were injured.

Investigation
The Administrador de Infraestructuras Ferroviarias has opened an investigation into the accident. The Comisión de Investigación de Accidentes Ferroviarios is also investigating the accident.

The data recorder was recovered from the wreckage. Information recovered from the data recorder showed that the train was travelling at  when it derailed.

References

2016 in Galicia (Spain)
Province of Pontevedra
Railway accidents in 2016
Derailments in Spain
September 2016 events in Europe